|}

The Chester Stakes is a Listed flat horse race in Great Britain open to horses aged three years or older. It is run at Chester over a distance of 1 mile, 6 furlongs and 87 yards (2,896 metres), and it is scheduled to take place each year in late August or early September. Prior to 2018 it was run as a handicap. The handicap element was removed in 2018 to comply with a recommendation that no handicap should carry Listed status, and it became a conventional Listed Race.

Winners since 1988

As a handicap

As a conditions race

See also

 Horse racing in Great Britain
 List of British flat horse races

References

 Racing Post:

Flat races in Great Britain
Chester Racecourse
Open long distance horse races